Chimaltenango is a city in Guatemala with a population of 96,985 (2018 census). It serves as both the capital of the department of Chimaltenango and the municipal seat for the surrounding municipality of the same name. The municipal capital produces textiles and pottery.

History

In Pre-Columbian times what is now the city of Chimaltenango was known to its native inhabitants as B'oko' .  Like many other cities in the area, the Spanish Conquistadores used the name given by their Nahuatl speaking allies from central Mexico. The Nahuatl name was Chīmaltenānco, meaning "Shield City."  The current town was found in 1526 by Spanish conquistador Pedro de Portocarrero, and shortly after it was assigned by bishop Francisco Marroquín to the Order of Preachers, along with Jocotenango, Jilotepeque, Sumpango, Candelaria, Amatitlán, Petapa, Mixco and Pinula.  The general areas with under the jurisdiction of "Valle de Pasuya" (English: Pasuya Valle) in those days, which had nine valleys, among them the Chimaltenango Valley; this valley bordered with Xilotepeque valle on the northwest, with Mixco valley on the East, with Guatemala on the North and with Sololá Prinvice on the West. Furthermore, the Valle of Pasuya had to mayor municipalities: Chimaltenango —which covered Chimaltenango, Xilotepeque and Alotenango valleys—, and Sacatepéquez —which covered the rest.

After the independence from Spain in 1821, the town was elevated to "villa" status in 1825 but apparently lost some luster, as one can infer from archeologists Alfred Percival Maudslay wife's description from a trip there in 1895. Anne Cary Maudslay, wrote: "We were not tempted to loiter for long, and rode on again over the dull plain to the [...] uninteresting town of Chimaltenango, where we
proposed to spend the night. The hotel was dirty and the bedrooms so unpleasant that we would have none of them, and sent Gorgonio to hunt for an empty room in which we could put up our own beds. This he found in a "meson", or caravanserai, attached to the hotel, where there was a goodsized room and a rough kitchen opening on a patio in which we could turn the beasts loose for the night. A sprinkling with water, a good sweeping, and a free use of Keating's powder, soon made the room habitable. The supper at the hotel was, however, far above the average, and the only thing to complain of was the poor forage supplied to the mules.".

Sports
América de Chimaltenango football club has played the 2009/2010 season in Guatemala's second division. They play their home games in the Estadio Municipal de Chimaltenango.

Famous citizens

 Natalia Górriz de Morales: teacher.  She was the director of "Instituto Normal Central para Señoritas" (English:Normal Central Institute for Girls) and Elementary School Inspector during general José María Reina Barrios presidency; married to then-minister of Economy, colonel Próspero Morales,who in 1897 resigned his position and raise on arms as one of the leaders of the Quetzaltenango Revolution against his former boss, after general Reina Barrios tried to extend his presidential term until 1902 even after the sound failure of the Central American Expo and the acute economic crisis that Guatemala was mired in.  After the Reina Barrios murder in February 1898, Morales ran for office in the 1898 presidential elections, but when he realized that those were rigged in favor of interim president Manuel Estrada Cabrera he tried to invade Guatemala from Mexico, but died in the attempt.  Natalia Górriz de Morales then started teaching again and became one of the more representative women of the early 20th century in Guatemala.

Climate

Chimaltenango has a subtropical highland climate (Köppen: Cwb).

Geographic location 

It is completely surrounded by Chimaltenango Department municipalities:

See also

Notes and references

References

Bibliography

External links
 
 CHIMALTENANGO from Guatemala.
 Monografia del municipio de Chimaltenango, Dirección Departamental de Educación de Chimaltenango 

Municipalities of the Chimaltenango Department